Meijin (名人) means "Brilliant Man".  It is the name of the second most prestigious Japanese Go Tournament. It also refers to a traditional Japanese title given to the strongest player of the day during the Edo period.

The tournament 
The Meijin tournament is sponsored by the Asahi newspaper, and has prize money of ¥36,000,000 for the winner and ¥10,400,000 for the runner-up.

The tournament is open to Nihon Ki-in and Kansai Ki-in players. A nine-player league decides the challenger each year. Every year, the three worst-ranked players in the league drop out. Entrance into the league is decided by three preliminaries. The first is between 1-4 dans (6 winners: 4 Nihon ki-in and 2 Kansai ki-in). The second is between 5-9 dans and the six winners (18 winners). The third is between these 18 and the 3 people dropped from the league (3 winners, who enter the league). Komi is 6.5. The time limit is 8 hours each in the title matches and 3 hours in the league and prelims. Byo-yomi is 1 minute per move.

History 
The title of "Meijin" derives from a game played by the first Hon'inbō, Sansa.  An onlooker (no less than Japanese warlord Oda Nobunaga) watched him play a particularly brilliant move and exclaimed "Meijin!" in appreciation of its greatness. The term was thereafter applied to the strongest player of the day.  Sansa, besides being Nobunaga's Go tutor, also taught Toyotomi Hideyoshi, who, after taking control, established Sansa as Godokoro, roughly meaning "Head of the Government Go Bureau." The Meijin title came to be greatly prized by all of the most promising Go prodigies of the age, freed from the cares of everyday life by the government stipends coming from the Go Bureau.  Most often held by members of the Hon'inbō school, it was also held by brilliant Yasuis and Inoues.  No player from Hayashi house attained Meijin status.  The title "Meijin" is also attached to the rank of 9 dan during this period hence there is only one 9-dan/Meijin at a time even if there are many players that are at the strength of a 9 dan.  8-dans in the Edo period are called Jun-Meijin which means half-Meijin which is a rank accorded to sixteen players in the Edo period.  After the Meiji Revolution, the four houses fell into disrepair due to the lack of government stipends.

In 1958, the Yomiuri newspaper decided to sponsor a "Strongest Player" tournament to decide the strongest player of the current time.  In 1961 the tournament's name was changed to Meijin.

Since they already sponsored the Shogi Meijin tournament, in 1975 the Asahi newspaper offered to buy the rights to the Meijin tournament from the Yomiuri. After months of debating, the title was sold and the Yomiuri began sponsoring a new title, Kisei (Go Saint). The tournament before 1976 thus became called the Old Meijin.

Historic Meijins

Past winners

In fiction
In the manga Hikaru no Go, there is a Meijin called Toya Koyo.

See also 

 International Go Federation
 List of professional Go tournaments
 Honorary Meijin
 Yasunari Kawabata, author of The Master of Go

External links
 Nihon Ki-in archive (in Japanese)
 The Meijin Tournament
 Meijin title games

References
 Classical Budo (1973), by Donn F. Draeger, pp. 27–30
 MEIJIN (2010, fiction), by John DiStano

History of Go
Go competitions in Japan